Rakesh Shrestha (born 14 January 1977) is a footballer from Nepal. He played for Nepal national football team in the 2002 FIFA World Cup qualification and various other tournaments. He also has played since 2003 for the Nepal Police Club, and has taken part in many tournaments at club level too, most notably the 2007 AFC President's Cup where the Police Club finished runners up.

References 

1977 births
Living people
Nepalese footballers
Nepal international footballers
Association football defenders
Footballers at the 1998 Asian Games
Asian Games competitors for Nepal